The Battle of Holbeck Moor was a clash between the British Union of Fascists and various anti-fascist demonstrators that took place in Holbeck, Leeds, on 27 September 1936.

Led by Oswald Mosley, around 1,000 fascists planned to lead a march through the Leylands (an area with a significant Jewish population), before the Leeds City Watch Committee banned their plans, fearing an outbreak of riots. Since the committee had not banned the fascists from marching elsewhere, however, they marched through the city before being met by 30 000 anti-fascist demonstrators in Holbeck Moor. With police forces shielding the fascists, Mosley attempted to give a speech, but was quickly drowned out. The stand-off then became violent, ending with the vastly outnumbered fascists forced to retreat.

The Battle reinforced opposition to fascism in city, and the news of the Battle that spread through anti-fascist movements elsewhere in the UK helped serve as inspiration in the planning for the more famous Battle of Cable Street, which took place a couple of weeks later in London.

In January 2020, John Mann, Baron Mann cited the Battle in his maiden speech in the House of Lords, stating that "For 70 years my family lived alongside Holbeck Moor in those two-up, two-down, back-to-back terraces and cobbled streets. I cannot claim with certainty that one of them threw the cobble that put Mosley in hospital, but there were 30,000 heroes yet nothing recorded."

See also  
 Battle of Stockton – an earlier incident between BUF members and anti-fascists in Stockton-on-Tees on 10 September 1933
 Battle of South Street – an incident between BUF members and anti-fascists in Worthing on 9 October 1934
 Battle of De Winton Field – a clash between BUF members and anti-fascists in the Rhondda on 11 June 1936

References

Fascism in England
Anti-fascism in the United Kingdom
Political riots
Riots and civil disorder in England
Antisemitic attacks and incidents in Europe
Racially motivated violence in England
September 1936 events